The 2019–20 season was the 123rd season in the history of Mansfield Town and their seventh consecutive season in the League Two. Along with League Two, the club also participated in the FA Cup, EFL Cup, and EFL Trophy.

Pre-season
The Stags announced pre-season friendlies against Swansea City, Bradford (Park Avenue), Alfreton Town, Blackburn Rovers, Hull City, and Nottingham Forest.

Competitions

League Two

League table

Results summary

Results by matchday

Matches
On Thursday, 20 June 2019, the EFL League Two fixtures were revealed.

FA Cup

The first round draw was made on 21 October 2019. The second round draw was made live on 11 November from Chichester City's stadium, Oaklands Park.≥

EFL Cup

The first round draw was made on 20 June.

EFL Trophy

On 9 July 2019, the pre-determined group stage draw was announced with Invited clubs to be drawn on 12 July 2019. The draw for the second round was made on 16 November 2019 live on Sky Sports.

Transfers

Transfers in

Loans in

Loans out

Transfers out

References

Mansfield Town F.C. seasons
Mansfield Town